Nana Tucker (born July 26, 1957), known professionally as Nana Visitor, is an American actress, best known for playing Kira Nerys in the television series Star Trek: Deep Space Nine and Jean Ritter in the television series Wildfire.

Early life
Nana Tucker was born July 26, 1957, in New York City, the daughter of Nenette Charisse, a ballet teacher, and Robert Tucker, a choreographer; she is a niece of actress/dancer Cyd Charisse.

Career
Visitor began her acting career in the 1970s on the Broadway stage in such productions as My One and Only. Her film debut (billed by her birth name, Nana Tucker) came in the 1977 horror film The Sentinel. On television, Visitor co-starred in the short-lived 1976 sitcom Ivan the Terrible and from 1978 to 1982, had short-lived regular roles on three soap operas: Ryan's Hope, The Doctors, and One Life to Live. Upon the suggestion of her older brother Paris, she adopted the stage name "Nana Visitor" in the early 1980s.

In 1984, she appeared in a season-two episode of Hunter. In 1985, Visitor made appearances on the television series MacGyver, in the season-one episode "Hellfire" as Laura Farren, and in the season-two episode "DOA: MacGyver" as Carol Varnay. She also made an appearance in the fourth-season Remington Steele episode titled "Steele Blushing" the same year. In 1986, she appeared in "Hills of Fire", a fourth-season episode of Knight Rider, as well as third-season Highway to Heaven episodes "Love at Second Sight" and "Love and Marriage, Part II" as Margaret Swann.

In 1987, Visitor appeared as Ellen Dolan in a failed television pilot for Will Eisner's pulp comic creation The Spirit, starring Sam J. Jones as the title character and Garry Walberg as her father, Commissioner Dolan.

In 1988, she made a guest appearance on the sitcom Night Court as a mental patient who is obsessed with the movies. That same year, she made a guest appearance on the television series In the Heat of the Night as the owner of the Sparta newspaper. She also made a guest appearance that year in an episode of Matlock. In 1989, Visitor appeared as a guest on the fifth episode of the television series Doogie Howser, M.D. as Charmagne, a rock star who has a throat nodule removed at Doogie's hospital, and as Miles Drentell's glamorous girlfriend, in "Success", a 1989 episode of Thirtysomethings second season.

In 1990, Visitor co-starred with Sandra Bullock in the short-lived sitcom Working Girl, which was based on the feature film of the same name.

From 1993 to 1999, Visitor appeared on Star Trek: Deep Space Nine as Major (later Colonel) Kira Nerys, a former freedom fighter/terrorist from the planet Bajor, who fought against the occupation of her world by the Cardassians. After the occupation ended, she was appointed as first officer to the series's eponymous space station, built by the Cardassians and turned over to Starfleet management.

After DS9 ended, Visitor had a recurring role as villain Dr. Elizabeth Renfro on the television series Dark Angel. Nana then starred as Roxie Hart in both the touring and Broadway companies of the musical Chicago,  including starring as Roxie as curtains rose again after September 11, 2001. Visitor was then cast as Jean Ritter on the ABC Family series Wildfire, which premiered on June 20, 2005.

In 2008, she appeared as Emily Kowalski, a dying cancer patient in "Faith", an episode of the reimagined Battlestar Galacticas fourth season. Visitor had a small role as Pamela Voorhees in the 2009 version of Friday the 13th. She has also lent her voice in a few guest appearances on the sitcom Family Guy, such as Rita in the episode "Brian's Got a Brand New Bag", and as the voice of the Enterprise in "Extra Large Medium." In 2011, she had a small part in the Hammer Horror film The Resident, playing the realtor. She appeared in Torchwood: Miracle Day episodes seven ("Immortal Sins") and eight ("End of the Road"). In 2012, she appeared as Dr. Patty Barker, a canine psychotherapist, in "An Embarrassment of Bitches", a season-four episode of ABC's Castle.

Personal life
Visitor was married to Nick Miscusi from 1989 to 1994. They have one son together. Visitor began dating her Star Trek: Deep Space Nine co-star Alexander Siddig and married him in June 1997. They divorced in April 2001. They had a son together, and her pregnancy was incorporated into her character and the series storyline, beginning in the 1996 fourth season episode "Body Parts". She gave birth to her son Django on September 16, 1996, during production of the episode "The Assignment," though her character would remain pregnant until the fifth-season episode "The Begotten". In early 2002, Visitor became engaged to Matthew Rimmer, previously company manager for the musical Chicago, and from 2017 Chief Operating Officer
of The Broad Stage in Santa Monica. They wed in April 2003 and were divorced as of 2011.  

Visitor and her Star Trek: Deep Space Nine co-star Terry Farrell were honored in 2001 when William Kwong Yu Yeung named two small Solar System bodies he had discovered after them – asteroid 26733 Nanavisitor and asteroid 26734 Terryfarrell.

Filmography

Film

Television

Stage

Video games

Web series

References

External links
 
 
 
 Full Out (web series)

1957 births
20th-century American actresses
21st-century American actresses
Actresses from New York City
American film actresses
American musical theatre actresses
American soap opera actresses
American television actresses
Living people